Love & Liberation is a 2019 studio album by Jazzmeia Horn.

The album received a Grammy Award nomination for Best Jazz Vocal Album.

References

2019 albums
Jazz albums by American artists